Smenospongia aurea is a species of sea sponge found in the Caribbean in the class Demospongiae. The scientific name of the species was first validly published in 1875 by Alpheus Hyatt, as Aplysina aurea.

See also
Smenospongia echina
5-Bromo-DMT
Hallucinogenic fish

References

Dictyoceratida
Animals described in 1875